The Young Cartoonist of the Year Award is an annual award given by the Cartoon Museum in London in association with the British Cartoonists' Association to the best young cartoonist, in the category of Under 18 and Under 30.

History
The Young Cartoonist of the Year Award was originally founded as the Mel Calman Awards in 1995, in memory of The Times cartoonist and Cartoon Art Trust founder. They are now run jointly by the Cartoon Art Trust and the British Cartoonists' Association. 

The awards ceremony has been held at the Postal Museum, London (1995), Simpson's-in-the-Strand (1996), and at the Mall Galleries during the Cartoon Art Trust Awards. More recently the ceremony has been at The Cartoon Museum.

Overview 

Entrants are requested to submit one cartoon, in colour or black and white, drawn freehand to a maximum size of A4. (In 2013 digitally created work was included.)

The awards are judged by noted cartoonists, including Oliver Preston, Martin Rowson, Steve Bell, Matt Pritchett, and Comics Laureate Hannah Berry. The competition receives around 1,000 submissions every year. 

Each winner receives a prize of £250 and a certificate.

Awards
Past winners include The New Yorker cartoonist Will McPhail and Matt Buck. 

 1995: Jonathan Cusick
 2007: James Hood
 2009:
 Best Cartoonist Under 18: Alexander Hildenborough
 Best Cartoonist Under 30: Nick Edwards
 2010: Alex Driver
 2017 Best Cartoonist Under 30: Ella Baron
 2020:
 Best Cartoonist Under 11: Daniel Meikle
 Best Cartoonist Under 30: Fergus Boylan
 2022: 
 Best Cartoonist Under 18: Rohan Rooney
 Best Cartoonist Under 30: Cara Grainger
 Woodcock Prize: nine-year-old Bianca Hsu
 2023:
 Best Cartoonist Under 18: Corb Calow Davies
 Best Cartoonist Under 30: Harriet Bourhill
 Woodcock Prize: ten-year-old George Whitehead

See also
 British Cartoonists' Association
 Cartoon Museum
 Cartoon Art Trust
 Cartoon Art Trust Awards

References

Annual events in the United Kingdom
Arts awards